The Casas de Los Pinos Solar Power Plant is a  photovoltaic power station in Castile-La Mancha, Spain. The facility was commissioned in November 2007, and was developed by Renovalia Solar SL.

See also 

 List of power stations in Spain

References 

Photovoltaic power stations in Spain
Energy in Castilla–La Mancha